Kevin Ross may refer to:
 Kevin Ross (American football) (born 1962), American football player
 Kevin A. Ross (born 1963), television host of America's Court with Judge Ross
 Kevin M. Ross, academic and president of Lynn University
 Kevin Ross (kickboxer) (born 1980), American kickboxer
 Kevin Ross (musician), American recording artist and songwriter